The Musherib class is a class of offshore patrol vessels built by Fincantieri for the Qatari Emiri Navy.

Development 
Fincantieri showcased the Musherib-class offshore patrol vessels for the Qatari Emiri Navy during DIMDEX 2018. In August 2017, Qatar officially announced for the order of the two ships of the class after signing the contract in June 2016. She started sea trials on 2 April 2021.

They are able to operate high speed boats such as rigid-hulled inflatable boats with the help of lateral cranes and hauling ramps.

Ships in class

References 

Ships built by Fincantieri 
Ships built in Italy
Musherib-class offshore patrol vessels
Patrol boat classes